This is a list of films which have placed number one at the weekend box office in Belgium and Luxembourg during 2007.

Notes
All the films are North American or British productions, except when stated differently.

See also
List of Belgian films - Belgian films by year

2007
Belgium
2007 in Belgium